Islip High School is the public high school in Islip, in Suffolk County, New York on the South Shore of Long Island. It is a part of the Islip School District.

 the principal is Lara Gonzalez. The complete lists of current and past graduates, Regents exam scores, and other important information can be found on the New York State School Information Report Comprehensive School Report, as well as on Newsday.com, as current as the 2010-2011 school year.

Graduates of Woodhull School (PK-6) of the Fire Island School District can attend Islip secondary schools, Islip High included.

Curriculum

The curriculum at the Islip high School includes all academic areas, as well as art, music, and technology. Beginning at the Middle School level, honors classes are offered in English, social studies, mathematics, science, Italian, and Spanish. Advanced Placement courses are offered in, including but not limited to, Art History, English Language and Composition, English Literature and Composition, US History, European History, US Government and Politics, Human Geography, Calculus AB, Statistics, Biology, Chemistry, Physics 1 & 2, Environmental Science, Seminar, Research, and the Italian and Spanish Languages. The High School also offers dual credit options through affiliations with Suffolk County Community College (Math & Music), Farmingdale State College (Business & Technology), Hofstra (Engineering), and St. John's University (Italian, Business, & Science).

Notable alumni
Alan Mayer, soccer goalkeeper
Pat Petersen, long-distance runner
Larry Saperstein, actor
Tom Veryzer, Major League Baseball player
Chris Wade, UFC Fighter
Sue Weber, soccer defender
Louis Dejoy, Postmaster General

Awards
In 2003, the cafeteria at Islip High School received the award for the Most Improved Cafeteria in the State from the New York State School  FoodService Association.

References 

Educational institutions in the United States with year of establishment missing
Islip (town), New York
Public high schools in New York (state)
Schools in Suffolk County, New York